Gurla Junction railway station is a railway station in Bundi district, Rajasthan. Its code is GQL. It serves Gurla. The station consists of 3 platforms. Passenger and Express trains halt here.

References

Railway stations in Bundi district
Kota railway division